Samar Minallah is a documentary filmmaker, and human rights activist from Pakistan.

Career 
Samar Minallah was born in Haripur District, Khyber Pakhtunkhwa province, in Pakistan. As a filmmaker she has created projects targeting social change in Pakistan, created for local audiences and are screened locally to generate dialogue around issues related to women and children. Her films especially capture culturally sanctioned forms of violence against women and girls.

Films 
Samar's lens has led to the inner stories of Pashtun women and their lives. She is from the school of filmmakers who believe they are empowered to challenge norms and  change mindsets through films.

Dar-Pa-Dar Where the Heart lies 
Minallah's film Dar-Pa-Dar Where the Heart lies consists of conversations with Afghan refugee women living in Khyber Pakhtunkhwa Province of Pakistan, who are faced with returning home and leaving the bodies of their loved ones behind.

Bajaur Gooloona - Homeless at Home 
Minallah's film Bajaur Gooloona - Homeless at Home focuses on tribal women and children displaced from their homes due to conflict.

Bibi Shireenay - Where Honor Comes From 
Minallah's film Bibi Shireenay - Where Honor Comes From is a folk song video about the economic and social contribution of Pakhtun women.

Allah - A Lullaby for You My Daughter 
Her film Allah - A Lulluby for You My Daughter is a lullaby dedicated to Pakhtun girls filmed in Afghanistan and Pakistan regarding the importance of education for girls.

Poles Apart--Chains do not keep marriages together 
Minallah's film Poles Apart was shot in Oslo, Jhelam, Gujrat, and Lalamusa. The documentary follows people community activists in these areas.

Kuch Khaab Hain Mairey - I have a dream 
Her film I have a dream, also known as Khuch Khaab Hain Meray, is a 35 minutes long documentary on child domestic labor in Pakistan, narrated by a seven year old domestic servant from Mardan. The narrator highlights the dangerous nature of the tasks she does as a part of her employment. The film also follow the story of an eight year old domestic worker from Clifton, Karachi, discussing the physical abuse suffered by their employer. Other children interviewed discuss the importance of education to them.

The Dark Side of Migration 
Minallah's film The Dark Side of Migration documents human trafficking in Pakistan

Swara--A Bridge Over Troubled Waters 
Minallah's documentary Swara explores marriages where girls are given as compensation to an enemy family to end disputes, often murders, and has been labelled anthropological activism. The film was shot in Darra Adam Khel, Khyber Agency, Mardan, Swabi and Peshawar the documentary.

Awards
Minallah received the Perdita Houston Human Rights Activist Award in 2014.

References

External links
 Pakistan working for Women's empowerment
 Land of a Thousand Colors - Communities with Diverse Culture

Pakistani documentary filmmakers
Living people
Hindkowan people
People from Haripur District
1964 births